The 2020–21 season is Virtus Bologna's 92nd in existence and the club's 4th consecutive season in the top flight of Italian basketball.

Overview 
In the season 2019–20, Virtus Bologna aimed to return to the highest level of the European Basketball. However, the season was hit by the coronavirus pandemic that compelled the federation to suspend and later cancel the competition without assigning the title to anyone. Virtus Bologna ended the championship in 1st position, but the title was not assigned. After a few weeks, also EuroCup season ended, where Bologna had reached the quarter finals.

In May 2020, Virtus signed Amar Alibegović, a young power forward from Virtus Roma and of the most talented young players of the championship, while in June, the club signed Amedeo Tessitori, a center of the national team from Treviso Basket, and Awudu Abass from Leonessa Brescia; Abass is a member of the national team and one of the most prominent Italian small forwards. The club completed the roster with Josh Adams, a point guard from Unicaja Málaga.

Kit 
Supplier: Macron / Sponsor: Segafredo

Players

Current roster

Depth chart

Squad changes

In

|}

Out

|}

Confirmed

|}

Coach

Competitions

Supercup

Final Four

Italian Cup 
Bologna qualified to the 2021 Italian Basketball Cup by ending the first half of the LBA season in the 4th position. They played the quarterfinal against the 5th ranking Umana Reyer Venezia.

Serie A

Regular season

Playoffs

Quarterfinals

Semifinals

Finals 

LBA Finals MVP
 Miloš Teodosić
Game rules
Game played under FIBA rules.

Eurocup

Regular season

Top 16

Playoffs

Quarterfinals

Semifinals

See also 

 2020–21 LBA season
 2020–21 EuroCup Basketball
 2021 Italian Basketball Cup
 2020 Italian Basketball Supercup

References 

Bologna
Bologna
Bologna